Putaqa (Quechua for Rumex peruanus, also spelled Potaga) is a mountain north of the Waqurunchu mountain range in the Andes of Peru, about  high. It is located in the Huánuco Region, Pachitea Province, Panao District. Putaqa lies northwest of a mountain named Ñawsaqucha and northeast of Waqurunchu.

References

Mountains of Peru
Mountains of Huánuco Region